Jordan (Es Salt) was a battle honour awarded to units of the British and Imperial Armies that took part in either of the following battles:

 The First Action of Es Salt, 24–25 March 1918
 The Second Action of Es Salt, 30 April – 4 May 1918

References

Battle honours of the British Army